William George Curbishley (born 13 March 1942, London) is an English music and film producer and band manager.  He has managed English rock groups The Who and Judas Priest, as well as artists Jimmy Page and Robert Plant.

Life
Curbishley was one of six children born to a London docker and his wife. He is the older brother of ex-West Ham United and Charlton Athletic manager Alan Curbishley, and grew up near West Ham Station in London. He married Jackie Curbishley, but the couple later divorced. He then remarried and had two children.

During the 1960s, Curbishley served a prison term for armed robbery of a bank van, though he denied involvement in the crime.

Curbishley owns a London home and a villa in Spain.

Career
Curbishley started his career in the music business in 1971 at Track Records, managing tours for The Who and other artists such as Thunderclap Newman, Golden Earring and The Crazy World of Arthur Brown. Curbishley produced The Who's film Tommy, the prison movie McVicar and also the film Buddy's Song, all starring The Who's Roger Daltrey. With Daltrey, he also established the Goldhawke production company to issue the singer's solo albums. Curbishley left Track in the mid-seventies after financial issues led to the decline of the company. With his wife Jackie, he established Trinifold Management Ltd., a music management company, in 1974.

After a royalty dispute, Curbishley's company acquired management of The Who in 1976 and soon expanded to manage other well-known artists such as Judas Priest and Robert Plant. It was at the suggestion of Curbishley that Plant disbanded his Shaken 'n' Stirred touring ensemble in the mid-1980s, starting afresh with a completely new band and writing with different musicians.  As a direct result of this, Plant re-emerged as a hugely successful recording and touring artist.

In 1994, Curbishley assumed management of guitarist Jimmy Page, and in the same year, was integral in the reuniting of Page and Plant, both former members of Led Zeppelin. Despite failed attempts by others to reunite the pair, Curbishely was able to persuade the previously reluctant Plant to work with Page again, resulting in the highly successful Unledded album, video and world tour. During this period, Curbishley and Trinifold also managed the solo career of Francis Dunnery (former frontman of It Bites, and Plant's guitarist prior to his reunion with Page).

Trinifold Music has published songs recorded by many other artists including Chicago, Kenny Rogers, Atlantic Starr, Karyn White, Faith Hill and Kenny Chesney. In 2004, UB40 and Rachel Fuller were added to Trinifold's roster. In 2001, Curbishley served as the executive producer of a BBC1 documentary on the life of Reggie Kray.
 
In 2002, Trinifold was acquired by The Sanctuary Group, but Curbishley continued to manage the company. He later embarked on more film production projects, including films such as The Railway Man.

Producer filmography
Selected films include:
The Railway Man - 2013
My Generation: Who's Still Who - 2008
Amazing Journey: Six Quick Ones - 2007
Amazing Journey: The Story of the Who - 2007
The Who: Tommy and Quadrophenia - Live with Special Guests - 2005
The Who: Live in Boston - 2003
Led Zeppelin - 2003
The Who & Special Guests: Live at the Royal Albert Hall - 2000
Mastercard Masters of Music Concert for the Prince's Trust - 1996
Unplugged: Jimmy Page & Robert Plant Un-Led-ed - 1994
The Who: Thirty Years of Maximum R&B - 1994
Great Performances: Pete Townshend's Psychoderelict - 1993
Buddy's Song - 1991
The Who Live, Featuring the Rock Opera Tommy - 1989
Deep End - 1986
Status Quo - End Of The Road '84 - 1984
Cool Cats: 25 Years of Rock 'n' Roll Style - 1983
McVicar - 1980
Quadrophenia - 1979
The Who: The Kids Are Alright - 1979
The Who: At Kilburn 1977 - 1977
The Who: Live at the Isle of Wight Festival 1970 - 1970

References

Bibliography
Dave Lewis and Simon Pallett (1997) Led Zeppelin: The Concert File, London: Omnibus Press. , p. 138.

External links 
 IMDb biography
 Trinifold

1942 births
English record producers
English film producers
Living people
Businesspeople from London
English music managers